Social Justice in the Liberal State  is a book written by Bruce A. Ackerman. The book is an essay in political philosophy, a "new view" of the theoretical foundations of liberalism that will "challenge us to clarify our own implicit notions of liberal democracy." Ackerman addresses the positive case for a liberalism that glorifies neither the state bureaucracy nor the private market. References to the sphere of relations among states are few, but the breadth of the attack on the fundamental issues of man and society is impressive. To Ackerman, liberalism is a kind of structured conversation in which verbal negotiation among those with differing visions of the good life is an alternative to the exercise of naked power. Ackerman has mounted a profound challenge to contract thinking. It works, crudely, on the idea that the premises of a course of contract reasoning can be manipulated so as to yield (more or less) any conclusion that the theorist has some antecedent interest in producing. The social contract is the contract which would be confirmed by the entire population, under ideal conditions, after perfect and complete consideration. Ackerman has offered a suggestion for determining whether any persons among a genetically diverse group are genetically disadvantaged. His suggestion is that to be genetically undominated, a person must possess a set of abilities that permit him to pursue some life purpose that some persons have, with as much facility as any other person is able to pursue that life purpose. He asserts that every person has a right to be genetically undominated. The privatization of religious convictions is also strongly defended. Ackerman argues for a maximal separation doctrine in that religion does not have an appropriate place in the public realm of a liberal democracy. The book also briefly suggests  "responsive lotteries", prototypes of lottery voting as a way to decide issues but leaves the question hanging in the air by inviting others to devote more serious thought to lottery voting.

See also 
 Political philosophy
 Social contract
 Social justice

References

External links 
 Social Justice in the Liberal State at Yale University Press
Related works
 Citizenship: European and Global at Universitetet i Oslos
 Common schooling and educational choice at Washington University in St. Louis
 Just Health Care and the Two Solidarities at Harvard Center for Population and Development Studies
 Religious Virtues, Religious Vices at George Mason University
Scholastic inclusion
 Public Lectures Academic Year 2002/2003 at Collegium Budapest Institute for Advanced Study
 SOC321 Social Justice at Lingnan University
 PH 3538 Social and Political Philosophy at University of Aberdeen
 Social Justice Resources  at Colorado Christian University

Philosophy books
Social justice
Books about liberalism